Sarratt is a village in Hertfordshire, England, and fictional location in John le Carré novels.

Sarratt may also refer to:

People
 Charles Madison Sarratt (1888–1978), American academic and administrator at Vanderbilt University
 Charley Sarratt (born 1923), former American football end who played one season with the Detroit Lions
 Jacob Sarratt (1772–1819), English chess player
 Reed Sarratt (1917–1986), American journalist and editor from North Carolina
 Robert Clifton Sarratt (1859-1926), American politician

Places
 Sarratt Bottom nature reserve, a biological Site of Special Scientific Interest in Sarratt, Hertfordshire
 Sarratt Creek, a creek in South Carolina, U.S.

See also
 Sarat (disambiguation)
 Sarrat, a municipality in Ilocos Norte, Philippines
 Surratt, a surname